The Sound is the third studio album by the San Francisco, California-based band New Monsoon. It was produced by Michael Shrieve (former drummer for Carlos Santana) and Paul Kimble.

Track listing
 Journey Man  – 5:48
 Trust In Me  – 4:26
 The Sound  – 5:31
 Sunrise  – 0:52
 Dark Perimeter  – 5:12 
 Another Night In Purgatory  – 3:56
 Broken Picture Window  – 7:03
 Rock Springs Road  – 5:21
 Bridge Of The Gods  – 8:06
 Hold On For Now  – 4:50
 Falling Out Of Trees  – 2:42

Personnel
New Monsoon:
Jeff Miller - vocals, electric guitars
Benjamin Bernstein - bass
Brian Carey - percussion, conga, timbales
Phil Ferlino - organ, piano, keyboards, vocals
Rajiv Parikh - percussion, tabla, vocals
Bo Carper - acoustic guitar, banjo
Michael Shrieve - percussion
Marty Ylitalo - drums

Steve Armstrong - assistant engineer
Clay Brasher - graphic design  
Joe Castwirt - mastering
Jonathan Chi - engineer
Paul Kimble - producer, engineer, mixing, piano, vocals, slide bass
Michael Shrieve - producer

External links
New Monsoon
[ All Music entry]
The Sound at HomeGrownMusic.net
Jeff Miller

2005 albums
New Monsoon albums